The binomial approximation is useful for approximately calculating powers of sums of 1 and a small number x.  It states that

 

It is valid when  and  where  and  may be real or complex numbers.

The benefit of this approximation is that  is converted from an exponent to a multiplicative factor.  This can greatly simplify mathematical expressions (as in the example below) and is a common tool in physics.

The approximation can be proven several ways, and is closely related to the binomial theorem.

Derivations

Using linear approximation 
The function

is a smooth function for x near 0.  Thus, standard linear approximation tools from calculus apply: one has

and so

Thus

Using Taylor series 
The function 

where  and  may be real or complex can be expressed as a Taylor series about the point zero.

This result from the binomial approximation can always be improved by keeping additional terms from the Taylor series above.  This is especially important when  starts to approach one, or when evaluating a more complex expression where the first two terms in the Taylor series cancel (see example).

Sometimes it is wrongly claimed that  is a sufficient condition for the binomial approximation. In this case  but the binomial approximation yields . For small  but large  , a better approximation is:

Example 
The binomial approximation for the square root, can be applied for the following expression,

The mathematical form for the binomial approximation can be recovered by factoring out the large term  and recalling that a square root is the same as a power of one half.

Evidently the expression is linear in  when  which is otherwise not obvious from the original expression.

Generalization

While the binomial approximation is linear, it can be generalized to keep the quadratic term in the Taylor series:
 

Applied to the square root, it results in:

Quadratic example
Consider the expression:

If only the linear term from the binomial approximation is kept  then the expression unhelpfully simplifies to zero

While the expression is small, it is not exactly zero. 
So now, keeping the quadratic term:

References

Factorial and binomial topics
Approximations